Californium oxychloride (CfOCl) is a radioactive salt first discovered in measurable quantities in 1960. It is composed of a single californium cation and oxychloride consisting of one chloride and one oxide anion. It was the first californium compound ever isolated.

See also
Californium compounds

References

External links
Web Elements page: Californium

Californium compounds
Oxychlorides